Nightcap often refers to:

 Nightcap (garment), a soft cloth cap worn in bed
 Nightcap (drink), a drink (often alcoholic) consumed before going to bed

Nightcap may also refer to:

Places
 Nightcap National Park, New South Wales, Australia
 Nightcap Range Important Bird Area, New South Wales, Australia
 Nightcaps, New Zealand, New Zealand community

Film, Radio, and TV
 The NightCap, Australian late-night TV show airing online and on Channel 7 HD from February 2008
 Nightcap (1953 TV series), a 1953–1954 Canadian music variety television series
 Nightcap (1963 TV series), a 1963–1967 Canadian comedy and variety television series
 Herb Jepko Nitecap Show, late night radio call-in show aired from 1964 to 1978
 Nightcap (2016 TV series), a 2016–2017 American comedy television series

Music
 Nightcaps (Seattle band), American lounge music band active 1994–Present
 The Nightcaps (Texas band), 1958-2009
 Nightcap: The Unreleased Masters 1973–1991, a 1993 double-disk album by Jethro Tull

Sport
 Nightcap (baseball), night game of a baseball doubleheader